The ANZAC Day Cup is a rugby league match contested annually in the National Rugby League between the Sydney Roosters and the St. George Illawarra Dragons. The ANZAC Day Cup was introduced in 2002 to honour the Australian and New Zealand Army Corps.

In 2020, due to the COVID-19 pandemic in Australia, the cup was instead contested on 6 August, the anniversary of the Battle of Lone Pine.

Results

2002

2003

2004

2005

2006

2007

2008

2009

2010

2011

2012

2013

2014

2015

2016

2017

2018

2019

2020

2021

2022

Head To Head

Ashton-Collier Medal
In 2013, the Ashton-Collier Medal was introduced as the award for player of the match. The award was named in honour of Ferris Ashton and Bill Collier, World War II veterans and former players of Eastern Suburbs and St George respectively.

See also

 Rivalries in the National Rugby League

References

External links

Sydney Roosters
St. George Illawarra Dragons
Rugby league competitions in New South Wales
Rugby league in Sydney
Rugby league rivalries
2002 establishments in Australia
Recurring sporting events established in 2002
Sports rivalries in Australia
ANZAC (Australia)